Eugen Dollmann (8 August 1900 – 17 May 1985) was a German diplomat and member of the SS.

Early life and family
The son of Paula Dollmann (born Schummerer) and Stefan Dollmann, he was born in 1900 in Regensburg. Dollmann graduated in 1926 at the Ludwig-Maximilians-Universität München as Doktor der Philosophie. From 1927 to 1930, Dollmann studied in Rome the history of the Farnese family and Italian art history.

He was living at the Piazza di Spagna where he worked as interpreter. There he met Heinrich Himmler who introduced him to Karl Wolff. In 1934 Dollmann become Italienkorrespondent of the Münchner Neueste Nachrichten. In 1935 he became Chief of the NSDAP/AO Press office in Italy. In 1937 he became SS-Obersturmbannführer.

Diplomatic career
In 1939 Dollmann was appointed German Ambassador to the Holy See. He helped Virginia Agnelli escape from detention, and with her help was able to arrange a meeting between SS-Obergruppenführer Karl Wolff and Pope Pius XII to negotiate the peaceful German evacuation of Rome. Later, as Befehlshaber der Polizei, he was Adjutant of Karl Wolff in a villa on the Lake Garda. On 20 July 1944 Dollmann was official interpreter at the meeting of Adolf Hitler and Benito Mussolini, at the Wolfsschanze, immediately after the 20 July plot.

Around 8 May 1945, Dollmann was protected from criminal prosecution of his involvement in war crimes by Cardinal Alfredo Ildefonso Schuster, Archbishop of Milan, with whom he had discussed the possibility for a separate peace between Nazi Germany and the Western Allies (Operation Sunrise). He hid Dollmann in a mental institution in Laveno-Mombello.

In 1946, Dollmann returned to Rome, was detected in a movie theater and arrested. He was liberated after an intervention by James Jesus Angleton of the CIA who accompanied him to Bern to see Allen Welsh Dulles. He lived in Switzerland under a false identity. In 1952, Dollmann was expelled from Switzerland to Italy on the grounds of having had a homosexual relationship with a Swiss official. Padre Parini helped him transfer to Spain, where he was employed by Otto Skorzeny in Donostia in the arms trade.

The Italian Intelligence Service issued false travel documents for Dollmann through Carlo Rocchi, a confidence man of the CIA in Milan. With these, Dollmann traveled into the Federal Republic of Germany. Dollmann was held in custody for one month for passport fraud.

Upon his release he lived in Munich in Das Blaue Haus, a boarding house at the back of the Munich Kammerspiele. He continued working as translator and made the translation for the German synchronization of La Dolce Vita by Federico Fellini.

He died in 1985 in Munich. The Italian historian Gianfranco Bianchi was executor of his will.

Dollmann formed the basis for the character of Major Bergmann in the film, Rome, Open City (1945) by Roberto Rossellini. He is also a character in the novel A Dark Song of Blood (2002) by Ben Pastor, set in Rome in 1944, and in Soviet TV-series Seventeen Moments of Spring (1973).

Notes

References
 E. Dollmann, Roma nazista 1937–1943. Un protagonista della storia racconta, Trad. Zingarelli Italo, Editore: Rizzoli, Collana: Superbur, 2002
 R. Breitman, Norman J. W. Goda, U.S. Intelligence and the Nazis, Cambridge University Press, Marzo 2005 
 Michael Salter, Nazi war crimes, US intelligence and selective prosecution at Nuremberg: controversies regarding the role of the Office of Strategic Services, Ed. Routledge, 2007

1900 births
1985 deaths
Ambassadors of Germany to the Holy See
SS officers
Reich Security Main Office personnel
Officials of Nazi Germany